Esfestanaj (also Romanized as Esfestānaj, Esfestānej, and Esfestānj; also known as Espestana and Yespestana) is a village in Sarajuy-ye Gharbi Rural District, in the Central District of Maragheh County, East Azerbaijan Province, Iran. At the 2006 census, its population was 500, in 115 families.

References 

Towns and villages in Maragheh County